Lake Shore Railway or Lake Shore Railroad may refer to:

 Lake Shore Railway (1868–1869), formerly the Cleveland, Painesville and Ashtabula Railroad
 Lake Shore and Michigan Southern Railway, along Lake Erie and across northern Indiana
 Lake Shore Electric Railway, an interurban between Cleveland and Toledo, Ohio